Rajendra Rathore (born 21 April 1955) is an Indian politician who is serving as deputy leader of opposition in Rajasthan Legislative Assembly. He is a Member of Legislative Assembly, Rajasthan from the BJP representing Churu Constituency.

Early life and education 
Rathore was born on 21 April 1955 in Harpalsar village, Sardarshahar, District Churu, Rajasthan. He was born to Uttam Singh Rathore, an RAS officer. He was schooled in Hanumangarh, Rajasthan, and then obtained his M.A. in 1980, D.L.L. in 1978, L.L.B. in 1977 at Rajasthan University, Jaipur. He was elected as the president of the Student Union at Rajasthan University in 1979.

He married Chand Kanwar, on 23 February 1978. The couple has a son, Parakram Singh Rathore.

Political career 
Rajendra Rathore has been a prominent face of the Bharatiya Janata Party in Rajasthan, for past 3 decades. He has emerged from numerous crises and has a strong grip on Rajput voters in the state; he enjoys huge popularity in Churu, Rajasthan. Rathore is also a big face of JAT Rajput politics of Churu, who have voted for him in huge numbers in Churu; Rathore had a very close relationship with Jat strongman, stalwart BJP leader and former Minister Digamber Singh. 
But he is losing his grip, in last election margin was just near 2,000 votes.
His friendship with Singh is till date considered the best one can have; despite both being politicians.Mr RS Rathore represented BJP stronghold leader in prayer meeting held at Phatehpur on 24 Dec 22 in loving memory of late shri Ratiramji Maharaj and Jan aakrosh yatra closure ceremony. He delivered a very good and emotional speech for return of BJP in Rajasthan.

Membership of the Rajasthan Legislative Assembly

Positions held in Government of Rajasthan

Social works
 Pandit Deen Dayal Upadhyay Medical College - In October 2018, Rathore took the unprecedented step of opening of Medical College in Churu which is now serving the medical study requirement of many students. 
 Lohia Law College - Lohia College has started post graduate courses and graduate level courses.
 Churu Nature Park - In September 2018, he inaugurated the grand nature park in Churu. After Jaipur's Central Park in Rajasthan, the second largest nature park is located in Churu. It is built on 90 bighas of land and more than 10 thousand saplings of about 20 species have been planted under the Naturopathy system. It is equipped with facilities like yoga center, two acupressure tracks, sand path, open gym, watch tower, knowledge park, women park, children park and Swami Gopaldas open air theatre.
 Medical Relief Society - In 1993-98, Rathore started the Medical Relief Society while being the Minister of Medical and Health Department.

References

2. https://timesofindia.indiatimes.com/city/jaipur/crisis-ploy-to-buy-power-from-pvt-firms-rathore/articleshow/91192983.cms. The Times of India 30 April 2022

4. https://www.abplive.com/states/rajasthan/rajasthan-bjp-leader-rajendra-rathore-object-congress-mlas-being-made-board-president-2060307. ABP Live 12 Feb 2022

5. https://www.youtube.com/watch?v=0v0qWTkOWgc. Zee Rajasthan 13 Dec 2021

People from Churu district
Living people
Indian prisoners and detainees
State cabinet ministers of Rajasthan
Bharatiya Janata Party politicians from Rajasthan
1955 births
Janata Dal politicians
Rajasthan MLAs 2018–2023